Kari-Anne Tønder Henriksen (born 22 April 1980) is a Norwegian team handball player.

She made her debut on the Norway women's national handball team in 2001, and played 12 matches for the national team. She received a silver medal  at the European Championship in 2002.

References

1980 births
Living people
Norwegian female handball players
21st-century Norwegian women